Michael Trubshawe (7 December 1905 – 21 March 1985) was a British actor and former officer in the Highland Light Infantry Regiment of the British Army. Trubshawe was very close friends with fellow British actor David Niven, serving with him at Malta and Dover. He was best man for both of Niven's weddings, and is constantly referred to in Niven's memoirs The Moon's a Balloon. Niven refers to finding out he would be working with him in The Guns of Navarone as 'A lovely bonus for me.'

Niven claims he lost touch with his army friend following Michael's marriage to Christian Scientist Margaret L McDougall, the daughter of flour magnate James Gladstone McDougall whose company joined Rank flours. Rank's owners had a Methodist background and the company formed Rank pictures to counter the loose morality of movie culture. Trubshawe was the son of architect Vyvian Trubshawe (1853–1924).

Partial filmography

 They Were Not Divided (1950) - Major Bushey Noble
 Dance Hall (1950) - Colonel
 The Lavender Hill Mob (1951) - British Ambassador
 Encore (1951) - Ascot Man (segment "The Ant and the Grasshopper")
 The Magic Box (1951) - Sitter in Bath Studio
 My Seal and Them (1951) - Sir Frederick
 The Card (1952) - Yeomanry Officer (uncredited)
 Brandy for the Parson (1952) - Redworth
 Something Money Can't Buy (1952) - Willy
 Meet Me Tonight (1952) - Professor 'Chaps' Chapsworth: Ways and Means
 The Titfield Thunderbolt (1953) - Ruddock
 The Rainbow Jacket (1954) - Gresham
 Orders Are Orders (1954) - A.D.C. Lt. MacAllister
 You Lucky People (1955) - Lt. Col. Barkstone-Gadsby
 Private's Progress (1956) - Col. Fanshawe
 Around the World in Eighty Days (1956) - Shop Customer in Photograph (uncredited)
 The Passionate Stranger (1957) - 2nd Landlord
 Doctor at Large (1957) - Colonel Graves
 The Rising of the Moon (1957) - Colonel Charles Frobisher (2nd Episode)
 I Accuse! (1957) - English Publisher
 Gideon's Day (1958) - Golightly
 Law and Disorder (1958) - Ivan
 Scent of Mystery (1960) - English Aviator
 The Guns of Navarone (1961) - Weaver
 The Best of Enemies (1961) - Col. Brownhow
 Operation Snatch (1962) - Col. Marston
 Reach for Glory (1962) - Maj. Burton
 The Mouse on the Moon (1963) - British Aide
 The Pink Panther (1963) - Felix Townes
 A Hard Day's Night (1964) - Casino Manager (uncredited)
 Danger Man (television series; 'The Colonel's Daughter') (1964) - Colonel Blakeley
 The Amorous Adventures of Moll Flanders (1965) - Lord Mayor of London
 Those Magnificent Men in Their Flying Machines (1965) - Niven
 The Sandwich Man (1966) - Guardsman
 The Spy with a Cold Nose (1966) - Braithwaite
 Bedazzled (1967) - Lord Dowdy
 A Dandy in Aspic (1968) - Flowers
 Salt and Pepper (1968) - 'Fake' First Lord
 Monte Carlo or Bust! (1969) - German Rally Official 
 Battle of Britain (1969) - Air Observer (uncredited)
 The Magic Christian (1969) - Sir Lionel (uncredited)
 The Rise and Rise of Michael Rimmer (1970) - Mandeville
 Fumo di Londra (1971) - Il Colonello

References

External links

1905 births
1985 deaths
English male film actors
People from Chichester
British Army personnel of World War II
20th-century English male actors
Highland Light Infantry officers